José Miguel Boissard Ramírez (born December 4, 1978 in San Cristóbal) is a judoka from the Dominican Republic, who competed in the men's half-middleweight category. He picked up a total of twelve medals in his career, including two bronzes from the Pan American Judo Championships, attained a fifth-place finish in the 81-kg division at the 2003 Pan American Games in Santo Domingo, and represented his nation Dominican Republic at the 2004 Summer Olympics.

Boissard qualified for the Dominican Republic squad in the men's half-middleweight category at the 2004 Summer Olympics in Athens, by placing seventh and receiving a berth from the Pan American Championships in Margarita Island, Venezuela. He lost his opening match to Germany's Florian Wanner, who placed him into an upper four-quarter hold (kami shiho gatame) to score an ippon victory at one minute and twenty-three seconds.

References

External links

1978 births
Living people
Dominican Republic male judoka
Olympic judoka of the Dominican Republic
Judoka at the 2004 Summer Olympics
Judoka at the 2003 Pan American Games
People from San Cristóbal, Dominican Republic
Pan American Games competitors for the Dominican Republic
20th-century Dominican Republic people
21st-century Dominican Republic people